Léon Vaudoyer (7 June 1803 – 9 February 1872) was a French architect.

Biography
Vaudoyer was born in Paris, the son of architect Antoine Vaudoyer.

With his contemporaries Félix Duban, Henri Labrouste, and Louis Duc  he became a leading light in architectural circles in the 1830s.

He won the Grand Prix de Rome in 1826. In 1838 he won the design competition for the hôtel de ville in Avignon (unrealized), and from 1845 onwards he (with Gabriel-Auguste Ancelet) enlarged the buildings of the Priory of Saint-Martin-des-Champs (now the Conservatoire National des Arts et Métiers). In 1852 he was given responsibility for reconstructing the Sorbonne (unrealized), and also for designing the polychrome Cathédrale Sainte-Marie-Majeure in Marseille.

Juste Lisch and Edmond Paulin were among his students.

References

Bibliography 
 Théodore Ballu: Notice sur M. Léon Vaudoyer. Firmin Didot Frères, Paris 1873.
 Barry Bergdoll, Daphné Doublet, Antoinette Le Normand-Romain, Marie-Laure Crosnier Leconte: Les Vaudoyer : une dynastie d'architectes. Réunion des musées nationaux, Paris, 1991. .
 David van Zanten: Designing Paris : the architecture of Duban, Labrouste, Duc, and Vaudoyer. MIT Press, 1987. .

External links

1803 births
1872 deaths
19th-century French architects
École des Beaux-Arts alumni
Architects from Paris
Prix de Rome for architecture
Members of the Académie des beaux-arts